Lieutenant-General Sir Alexander Campbell, 1st Baronet,  (20 August 176011 December 1824) was a senior officer of the British Army during the early nineteenth century. His long and varied career saw extensive action, including engagements in Europe during the American Revolutionary War, in India during the Fourth Anglo-Mysore War and subsequently in the Peninsular War as one of the Duke of Wellington's generals. Badly wounded during the Peninsular campaign, Campbell was rewarded with a knighthood and a baronetcy, later holding a number of prestigious military commands.

Life
Alexander Campbell was born in 1760, the son of John Campbell of Achalader, Perthshire (of a branch of the Breadalbane Campbells) and Isabella, daughter of John Campbell of Barcaldine. In 1776 at the outbreak of the American Revolutionary War, 16-year-old Campbell purchased a commission in the Royal Regiment and by 1780 had become a captain, moving to the 97th Regiment of Foot. In 1781 the 97th was ordered aboard ships of the Channel Fleet for service as temporary Royal Marines and Campbell served at the Great Siege of Gibraltar and the Battle of Dogger Bank against the Dutch in the same year. He returned to Gibraltar the following year and remained there until the end of the siege in 1783, when the regiment was disbanded at Hillsea and Campbell was placed on half pay.  In 1787, Campbell secured a commission in a new regiment being raised for service in India, named the 74th Regiment of Foot, sailing in 1793.

In India Campbell rose rapidly through the ranks and by 1795 was a lieutenant colonel, serving in the Fourth Anglo-Mysore War in 1799 under General Sir Arthur Wellesley and participating in the Battle of Seringapatam that concluded the campaign. In the aftermath of the victory, Campbell was detached from his regiment and served in a number of military administration posts in Southern India, including governor of Seringapatam in 1805. In 1804 his eldest son, John Morshead Campbell, had been killed at the Battle of Assaye and some months later Campbell had been stationed at the port city of Vizagapatam when it was attacked by a French squadron under Charles-Alexandre Durand Linois: Campbell directed the harbour's defences in the Battle of Vizagapatam, in which the French were driven off despite the loss of two East Indiaman merchant ships. In 1807, Campbell returned to Europe.

Campbell was appointed brigadier general and was stationed in Ireland, before joining Wellesley's army in Portugal during the Peninsular War in January 1809. Several months later he was wounded in the thigh at the Battle of Talavera, returning to Britain to recuperate. By January 1810 he was back with the army in Portugal as a major-general, commanding the British 6th Division at the Battle of Fuentes de Oñoro. Shortly afterwards however his health deteriorated and he returned to Britain. His second son, Allan William Campbell was killed in action in the Peninsular War, at the Battle of Sorauren in 1813. In 1812 Campbell acted as Wellington's stand in at his investiture, Knight Commander of the Order of the Bath. Campbell would be inducted into the order later in the year. He was also made governor of the military forces on Mauritius and Île Bourbon remaining there as a lieutenant-general until they were returned to the French in 1816. In 1815, Campbell was transferred at the reformation of the Order of the Bath as Knight Grand Cross of the Order of the Bath and was also given a baronetcy. In 1820 he was made Commander-in-Chief of the Madras Army. He died on 11 December 1824 at Madras and was interred there, the baronetcy passing to his grandson Alexander Thomas Cockburn.

He was granted an augmentation of honour to his coat of arms: above his inherited arms (Campbell quartering Lorn and Stewart) was added "a chief argent charged with a rock proper subscribed Gibraltar, between two medals for Seringapatam and Talavera" commemorating his part in the Great Siege of Gibraltar.

Family
In 1783 Campbell married Olympia Elizabeth (died 1794), eldest daughter of William Morshead of Cartuther, Cornwall. They had three daughters (Olympia, Isabella, and Amelia), and two sons. The elder son, Lieutenant John Morshead Campbell was killed at the Battle of Assaye in 1803 during the Second Anglo-Maratha War, and the younger Major Allan William Campbell died of his wounds at Pamplona on 9 October 1813 having been wounded at the battle of Sorauren whilst attached to the Portuguese army during the Peninsular War.

On 3 November 1808, Campbell married Elizabeth Anne (died 1870), daughter of the Revd Thomas Pemberton. The couple had a son who died in infancy and a daughter called Flora Elizabeth (born 1824).

On 3 July 1821—after the death of his three sons—Campbell obtained a renewed patent to the baronetcy, extending the limitation to his grandson Alexander Thomas Cockburn (the son of Campbell's eldest daughter Olympia), and if Alexander Thomas were to die without a male heir, to the male issue of his second daughter Isabella Charlotte, Lady Malcolm. Alexander Thomas Cockburn took an additional surname in 1825 becoming Cockburn-Campbell. His descendant, Sir Alexander Thomas Cockburn-Campbell, 7th Baronet, lives in Australia, as did his father and grandfather.

Notes

References

 

 

|-

|-

|-

1760 births
1824 deaths
British Army lieutenant generals
Baronets in the Baronetage of the United Kingdom
Knights Grand Cross of the Order of the Bath
British Army personnel of the American Revolutionary War
British Army personnel of the French Revolutionary Wars
British Army personnel of the Napoleonic Wars
74th Highlanders officers
Royal Scots officers
British military personnel of the Fourth Anglo-Mysore War